At the 1980 Summer Olympics, fourteen different artistic gymnastics events were contested, eight for men and six for women.  All events were held at the Sports Palace of the Central Lenin Stadium in Moscow from July 20 through 25th.  Several teams who had qualified to compete were absent as a result of the 1980 Summer Olympics boycott, including the United States, Canada, China, Japan, South Korea, and West Germany.

For the first time in Olympic competition, in event finals for the vault an average of two vaults was used as the final score, rather than the best of two vaults.

Format of competition
The gymnastics competition at the 1980 Summer Olympics was carried out in three stages:

Competition I - The team competition/qualification round in which all gymnasts, including those who were not part of a team, performed both compulsory and optional exercises.  The combined scores of all team members determined the final score of the team.  The thirty-six highest scoring gymnasts in the all-around qualified to the individual all-around competition.  The six highest scoring gymnasts on each apparatus qualified to the final for that apparatus.
Competition II - The individual all-around competition, in which those who qualified from Competition I performed exercises on each apparatus.  The final score of each gymnast was composed of half the points earned by that gymnast during Competition I and all of the points earned by him or her in Competition II.
Competition III - The apparatus finals, in which those who qualified during Competition I performed an exercise on the individual apparatus on which he or she had qualified.  The final score of each gymnast was composed of half the points earned by that gymnast on that particular apparatus during Competition I and all of the points earned by him or her on that particular apparatus in Competition III.

Each country was limited to three gymnasts in the all-around final and two gymnasts in each apparatus final.

Medal summary

Men's events

Women's events

Medal table

See also

Olympic medalists in gymnastics (men)
Olympic medalists in gymnastics (women)
1979 World Artistic Gymnastics Championships

References

External links
Official Olympic Report
www.gymnasticsresults.com
www.gymn-forum.net

 
1980 Summer Olympics events
1980
1980 in gymnastics
International gymnastics competitions hosted by the Soviet Union